Ronald Reagan is a bronze sculpture depicting the American politician of the same name by Chas Fagan, installed at the United States Capitol's rotunda, in Washington, D.C., as part of the National Statuary Hall Collection. The statue was donated by the U.S. state of California in 2009, and replaced one depicting Thomas Starr King, which the state had gifted in 1931. The statue stands on top of fragments from the Berlin Wall.

See also
 2009 in art
 Cultural depictions of Ronald Reagan
 List of sculptures of presidents of the United States

References

External links
 

2009 establishments in Washington, D.C.
2009 sculptures
Bronze sculptures in Washington, D.C.
Cultural depictions of Ronald Reagan
Monuments and memorials in Washington, D.C.
Monuments and memorials to Ronald Reagan
National Statuary Hall Collection
Sculptures of men in Washington, D.C.
Reagan, Ronald